A diversion program, also known as a pretrial diversion program or pretrial intervention program, in the criminal justice system is a form of pretrial sentencing that helps remedy behavior leading to the arrest. Administered by the judicial or law enforcement systems, they often allow the offender to avoid conviction and include a rehabilitation program to avoid future criminal acts. Availability and the operation of such systems differ in different countries.

Operation and functions
A criminal justice diversion program deals mainly with first-time offenders, allowing them to avoid a criminal record by undertaking certain actions that are aimed to benefit the offender as well as their victims and the wider community.  

When a criminal offender joins a rehabilitation program to help remedy the behavior leading to the original arrest, it allows the offender to avoid conviction and, in some jurisdictions, avoid a criminal record. The programs are often run by a police department, court, district attorney's office, or outside agency. Problem-solving courts typically include a diversion component as part of their program. The purposes of diversion are generally thought to include relief to the courts, police department, and probation office, better outcomes compared to the direct involvement of the court system, and an opportunity for the offender to avoid prosecution by completing various requirements for the program. These requirements may include:

Education aimed at preventing future offenses by the offender
Restitution to victims of the offense
Completion of community service hours
Avoiding situations for a specified period in the future that may lead to committing another such offense (such as contact with certain people)

Diversion programs often frame these requirements as an alternative to court or police involvement or, if these institutions are already involved, further prosecution.  Successful completion of program requirements often will lead to a dismissal or reduction of the charges while failure may bring back or heighten the penalties involved. Charges dismissed because of a diversion program will still lead to additional criminal history points under the US Sentencing Guidelines if there was a finding of guilt by a court or the defendant pleaded guilty or otherwise admitted guilt in open court, provided that the deferred disposition or deferred adjudication was not a juvenile matter.

Diversion and juvenile justice 

The concept of juvenile diversion is based on the theory that processing certain youth through the juvenile justice system may do more harm than good.  Programs meant to divert juvenile delinquents are often fundamentally different from the programs meant for adults.  Many times youth will present with substance abuse and mental health issues which may be the underlying cause of such delinquency.

A juvenile diversion program has the ability to be used as an intervention strategy for first-time offenders who have broken the law and found themselves in the juvenile justice system ("Juvenile Diversion Programs"). There are many benefits to this program, including  avoiding the child from being influenced by more serious criminals in a juvenile detention center; allowing the courts to use resources that are needed for those juvenile delinquents who are an actual threat to the society; and getting the child help with drug addiction or family issues.

By country

Australia
Australia has a federal system of government, in which the various states and territories have separate law enforcement agencies and judicial systems. There have been court diversionary programs in operation since the late 20th century. They take different forms, and in the 21st century usually take the form of an adjournment of a criminal case by a magistrates court while a defendant undertakes a rehabilitation program, often for substance abuse. Some programs may be undertaken before or after the determination of guilt, while others are only available after conviction, and before sentencing. They are usually only available for people with little prior contact with the justice system, and for minor offences.

Programs include those for people with disabilities or special needs; sex workers; homeless people; or Indigenous Australians. Diversionary programs for Aboriginal and Torres Strait Islander people are operated by Koori Court in Victoria; Youth Koori Court in New South Wales; Aboriginal Community Court in Western Australia; and, from 2002 to 2012, Murri Court in Queensland.

Georgia
In the country of Georgia, diversion programs give one chance to a first-time offender juvenile to avoid a criminal record and conviction in exchange for the commitment to comply with a specific set of requirements. The purpose of the obligatory activities is to positively influence the offender and help him/her to become a better citizen for the society.

A juvenile diversion and mediation program was initiated in 2010 as a pilot project to be implemented in four cities: Tbilisi, Rustavi, Batumi, and Kutaisi. As Andro Gigauri, a high official at the Ministry of Justice of Georgia and the author of the program anticipated, in 2011, diversion and mediation program expanded with the adoption of the Amendments to the Criminal Procedure Code of Georgia. Since 2013, the diversion program applies to all first-time offenders (without geographical limitations) which commit a non-violent crime, in cases of the alleged offender is up to 21 years old. Since 2015, the juvenile diversion and mediation program is also regulated under the Juvenile Justice Code of Georgia.

Between 2010–2019, more than 4,000 juveniles benefited from the diversion and mediation program in Georgia and only 9 committed a repeated crime.

The decision on juvenile diversion is taken by the prosecutor/attorney. A social worker is then assigned to the case to assess the bio-psycho-social profile of the juvenile. At the end of the assessment, the social worker recommends a set of requirements to be included in a diversion contract. The mediation process initiates with the victim's consent. A neutral/independent mediator is assigned to the case. The mediator's tasks are: facilitating dialogue between the offender and the victim, helping the reconciliation process and reaching an agreement on damage restitution.

United Kingdom
Diversion can ensure that people with mental health problems who enter (or are at risk of entering) the criminal justice system are identified and provided with appropriate mental health services, treatment, and any other support they need. In the UK, the Centre for Mental Health has shown that such diversion represents good value for money, with well-designed intervention helping to reduce reoffending by a third. The need for joined-up services was the focus of a Centre for Mental Health lecture in 2011, in which NHS Confederation chairman Sir Keith Pearson emphasised the need to use custody more effectively and divert those who need it into treatment.

In February 2012, the UK government pledged to roll out a national liaison and diversion service by 2014, with 101 sites duly announced by the Department of Health. Diversion has also been found to be a key element of a more effective approach for young adults in the criminal justice process. A two-year UK pilot organised by the Centre for Mental health, with support and funding from the Department of Health the Youth Justice Board, looked into how to ensure that children and young people with mental health and other problems get the help they need as soon as they enter the youth justice system.

United States
The availability of diversion programs depends upon the jurisdiction, the nature of the crime (usually non-violent offenses), and in many cases the exercise of prosecutorial discretion. A 2016 The New York Times investigation revealed that some prosecutors charged substantial fees for, and received significant revenue from, diversion programs. Those fees can operate as a barrier to impecunious defendants accessing diversion. Pleading guilty is sometimes a prerequisite to access to a diversion program. This means that if a defendant proceeds to a diversion program, then fails to pay the fee for the program, the defendant can be brought back to court and proceed directly to conviction and sentencing.

Some jurisdictions in the United States may provide diversion programs for drunk driving charges. One such program is the Victim Impact Panel (VIP) administered by Mothers Against Drunk Driving (MADD) since 1982. MADD typically charges a $25 "donation" (which is defined as voluntary), even for court-mandated attendance; MADD reported $2,657,293 one year for such donations on its nonprofit tax-exempt returns.

In Florida, several counties offer a diversion program for veterans of the U.S. Armed Forces. Those who qualify and complete the program will have the criminal charge dismissed and can get the case expunged from their record.

See also
 Deferred prosecution
 Nolle prosequi
 Plea bargain

References

Courts
Punishment
Criminal law
Crime prevention